The Crystal Mosque or Masjid Kristal is a mosque in Wan Man, Kuala Terengganu, Terengganu, Malaysia. A grand structure made of steel, glass and crystal, the mosque is located at the Islamic Heritage Park on the island of Wan Man. The mosque was constructed between 2006 and 2008, and was officially inaugurated on 8 February 2008 by the 13th Yang di-Pertuan Agong, Sultan Mizan Zainal Abidin of Terengganu. It has the capacity to accommodate over 1,500 worshipers at a time.

Gallery

See also 
 List of mosques in Asia
 Kuala Terengganu
 Islamic Heritage Park
 Islam in Malaysia

References

Further reading 
  Pembinaan TTI Dan Masjid Kristal Jadi Mercu Tanda Umat Islam. BERNAMA. 8 February 2008, 21:34 MST.

Mosques in Terengganu
2008 establishments in Malaysia
Kuala Terengganu
Mosques completed in 2008
Mosque buildings with domes